Collins is a tiny lunar impact crater located on the southern part of the Mare Tranquillitatis. It is located about 25 kilometers to the north of the Apollo 11 landing site, Tranquility Base. Named after American astronaut Michael Collins, the crater is the central member of the row of three craters named in honor of the Apollo 11 crew members. About 15 kilometers to the west-northwest is the landing site of the Surveyor 5 lunar probe.

This crater was previously identified as Sabine D before being renamed by the IAU.  Sabine itself is to the west of Collins.

See also
 Armstrong (crater)
 Aldrin (crater)

External links
 Lunar Orbiter 2 Image 76, showing Collins crater
 Lunar Orbiter 5 Image 74 h2, showing Collins crater

References

 
 
 
 
 
 
 
 
 
 
 

Impact craters on the Moon
Apollo 11
Michael Collins (astronaut)